Development ethics is a field of enquiry that reflects on both the ends and the means of economic development. It typically takes a normative stance, asking and answering questions about the nature of ethically desirable development and what ethics means for achieving development, and discusses various ethical dilemmas that the practice of development has led to. Its aim is to ensure that "value issues" are an important part of the discourse of development.

Key themes 
Development ethics typically looks at development theories and practice and their relationships with:
 Social justice
 Human rights
 Basic needs

A major focus of the literature is on the "ethics of the means". This involves asking not only how to realize the goals of development but also what are ethical limits in their pursuit.

Denis Goulet, one of the founding fathers of the discipline, argued in The Cruel Choice (1971) that     "Development ethics is useless unless it can be translated into public action. By public action is meant action taken by public authority, as well as actions taken by private agents by having important consequences for the life of the public community. The central question is: How can moral guidelines influence decisions of those who hold power?"

Prominent development ethicists 

David A. Crocker
Séverine Deneulin
Jay Drydyk
Des Gasper
Denis Goulet
Lori Keleher
Serene J. Khader
Christine Koggel
Stacy Kosko
Louis-Joseph Lebret
Gunnar Myrdal
Martha Nussbaum
Eric Palmer
Ingrid Robeyns
Dudley Seers
Amartya Sen
Nikos Astroulakis

References

Further reading 
 
Dower, N. (1988) 'What is Development?—A Philosopher's Answer', Centre for Development Studies Occasional Paper Series, 3, Glasgow: University of Glasgow.
Gasper, D. (1994) "Development Ethics: An Emergent Field?" in R. Prendergast and F. Stewart (eds.) Market Forces and World Development, London: Macmillan; New York: St. Martin's Press.
Goulet, D. (1971) The Cruel Choice: A New Concept in the Theory of Development (New York: Athenaeum).
Goulet, D.(1977) The Uncertain Promise: Value Conflicts in Technology Transfer (New York: IDOC/NA).
 Goulet, Denis (1996) A New Discipline: Development Ethics, The Kellogg Institute Working Papers - Working Paper #231 - August
Gunatilleke, G., Neelen Tiruchelvam, and Radhika Coomaraswamy (eds.) (1988) Ethical Dilemmas of Development in Asia, Lexington, MA: Lexington Books.
Khader, Serene J. (2011) Adaptive Preferences and Women's Empowerment. New York: Oxford University Press.
Seers, Dudley (1977) The New Meaning of Development, International Development Review
Astroulakis, N. (2011), "The development ethics approach to international development", International Journal of Development Issues, Vol. 10 No. 3, pp. 214-232. https://doi.org/10.1108/14468951111165359

External links 
International Development Ethics Association

Ethics
Ethics